Pleasant Grove Township is one of twelve townships in Coles County, Illinois, USA.  As of the 2010 census, its population was 1,327 and it contained 573 housing units.

Geography

Cities, towns, villages
 Lerna

Unincorporated towns
 Trilla

Extinct towns
 Campbell

Cemeteries
The township contains 14 cemeteries: Armstrong, Bales, Beals, Doty, Janesville, Leitch, Lower Muddy, Mount Tabor, New Indian Creek, New Kelley, Old Indian Creek, Shiloh, Upper Muddy and Wright.

Rivers
 Embarras River

Landmarks
 Janesville

Demographics

School districts
 Charleston Community Unit School District 1
 Mattoon Community Unit School District 2
 Neoga Community Unit School District 3

Political districts
 Illinois' 15th congressional district
 State House District 110
 State Senate District 55

References
 
 United States Census Bureau 2007 TIGER/Line Shapefiles
 United States National Atlas

External links
 City-Data.com
 Illinois State Archives

Adjacent townships 

Townships in Coles County, Illinois
Townships in Illinois